The Battle of the Frogs (or the Windham Frog Fight) is a local legend concerning a 1754 incident in Windham, Connecticut when the loud croaking of thousands of bullfrogs (Lithobates catesbeianus) in a nearby pond led citizens of the town to panic and assume that Windham was under attack, some of them mistaking the croaks for shouted words or the beating of drums.

Legend

The gruesome battle was actually a large-scale die-off of frogs in a millpond known as Frog Pond. In 1754, Windham was experiencing a severe drought and the French and Indian War had recently broken out. An attack from French and native forces was also expected from Canada. One night, in June, the frogs began to attack each other over the last remaining water. The resulting noise was so great that the townspeople thought that it was the attack already happening. Many took to arms. This led to mass hysteria of sorts. Numerous people became convinced that Armageddon was upon them. Some sources claim that the names "Dyer" and "Elderkin" were heard, the names of two influential lawyers and colonels. Other sources say that the people thought they were Native Americans saying "gin" and "rum." Townsfolk ran into the streets, some with guns and knives. Those who were armed mounted a hill to see the landscape around them. In the morning, the colonists found the cause of the noise. Hundreds of dead and dying bullfrogs lay in the last remaining parts of the pond.

Colonel Eliphalet Dyer and Colonel Jedediah Elderkin were both Yale graduates and lawyers who had set up offices in Windham.

Aftermath
People throughout the colonies heard the story and many were amused. Apparently, one could not go very far from home and hear something about bullfrogs. John Warner Barber wrote in the 1836 book Connecticut Historic Collections that the incident had occurred in July 1758. He wrote that "Long and obstinately [fought] was the contest, and many thousands of combatants were found dead on both sides of the ditch the next morning."

The people of Windham were ridiculed in the colonies, and the town seal was made to be a bullfrog. The event has become memorialized as a part of the town's folklore. The pond, formerly known as Follett's Pond, was renamed Frog Pond.

Accounts

In 1857, William Lawton Weaver compiled the 48-page booklet The Battle of the frogs, at Windham, 1758: with various accounts and three of the most popular ballads on the subject. It was published by James Walden in Willimantic. In his introduction, Weaver offers his own interpretation of the events.

Account of Samuel Peters
Reverend Samuel Peters, then a student at Yale University, wrote an account of the incident in the 1787 History of Connecticut. In his version the frogs were located some five miles from Windham in "an artificial pond three miles square." Peters writes that the frogs, having found the water dried up, hopped their way towards the Willimantic River. He states that the frogs "filled a road forty yards wide for four miles in length," entered Windham around midnight, and were several hours in their passage. In his account, the residents of Windham fled naked from their beds with "worse shrieking than that of the frogs," fearing an earthquake or "dissolution of nature." He relates that the men retreated a half mile and upon their return heard from the "enemy's camp" voices uttering words "Wight, Hilderken, Dier, Tete." They only discovered that their attackers were frogs after three men were sent to negotiate.

According to a review of his account in American Notes and Queries, his prejudices "led him to connive at the dismemberment of Connecticut." Peters, who had Tory sympathies, was forced to leave the country in 1774. The review, noting that Peters exaggerated the area of Frog Pond and its distance from town, also observed that a migration of frogs would likely have sought out the Shetucket River, which was closer than the Willimantic.

Account of Sinda
Ellen Douglas Larned, in the second volume of her 1880 History of Windham County, Connecticut, relays another account:

Scientific explanations
Frog behavior specialist Susan Z. Herrick, who grew up in Windham, suspects the bullfrogs were making advertisement calls. The bullfrogs, confronted with a shrinking shoreline and being pushed together as they lost physical territory, may have shifted their mating strategy. With so many males in a small pond, Herrick speculates that "all the males gave up on having any territory at all and focused strictly on at least getting a female. With no coordination of calls, it must have been a God-awful noise, and I think this is what the villagers heard."

Legacy
The Battle of the Frogs is celebrated in many ways including as a song, bullfrogs as symbols on their heraldic devices and coat of arms. During a 1902 visit by President Theodore Roosevelt, a banner commemorating the Battle of the Frogs was displayed. Willimantic, Connecticut has a bridge with statues of frogs commemorating the event.

Ballads
Three ballads have been written about the Battle of the Frogs. Ebenezer Tilden is credited as the author of "The Lawyers and Bull-Frogs", whose closing stanza says "Lawyers, I say, now from this day, be honest in your dealing. And never more increase your store, while you the poor are killing." The ballad is "a true relation of a strange battle between some Lawyers and Bull-Frogs, set forth in a new song written by a jolly farmer of New England." There was another ballad called "The Frogs of Windham". A third ballad entitled "The Bull-Frog Fright: A Ballad of the Olden Time" had forty-four stanzas and was published in 1851.

Banknotes

The Windham Bank, chartered in 1832, produced banknotes that included a frog vignette. The vignette, featured prominently in the lower right of the notes, depicts a frog sitting atop another overturned, and dead, frog. The bank included the vignette in their $1, $2, $3, $5 and $10 denominations through to the 1870s.

The Frogs of Windham
Former Willimantic Enterprise owner Nason W. Leavitt and his son Burton Leavitt wrote the comic opera The Frogs of Windham in the 1880s. Published and copyrighted in 1891, the operetta includes a romantic subplot where Colonel Dyer tries to marry his daughter to a "weak-minded English youth." A farmer boy smitten with her then plots to have the English lord captured by Mohegan Indians. The show's "Frog Ballet" was reported to have "caused much merriment" and the drinking song "Good Old Windham Flip" honored a local alcoholic concoction. The operetta contains numerous ethnic stereotypes, including an "Injun" war dance, a German character named Lim Burger, African American characters who are enslaved by Dyer, dancing gypsies, and an English lord with a speech impediment. The battle of the frogs is introduced in the last half of the third act as a mysterious noise. Colonel Dyer is convinced by a parson that the noise is God's way of telling him that he shouldn't stop his daughter from marrying the person she loves. The Frogs of Windham was performed throughout Connecticut in the late 1800s and early 1900s. The operetta's 82-page piano score is held by the Library of Congress.

An updated production of The Frogs of Windham was prepared for the sesquicentennial of the incorporation of Willimantic in 1983. The Sesquicentennial Fine Arts Committee used state and city grants to finance the set and costumes. Kramer Middle School teacher Robert Brouillard called the operetta "a director's nightmare," noting its amateurish libretto and comparing it to the fictional musical Springtime for Hitler. Brouillard rewrote the story, which was "riddled with racial and ethnic epithets." The production included antique muskets and featured the Windham Community Orchestra as well as the choreography of Windham Ballet artistic director Barbara Johnson. University of Connecticut music professor David Maker provided orchestration that the score had previously lacked. The Windham Theatre Guild performed the work again in 1992.

Thread City Crossing

Willimantic's Thread City Crossing, also known as the Frog Bridge, was completed in 2000 and crosses the Willimantic River. Four 11-foot copper frogs are perched lazily on giant spools on either side of the bridge. Designed by artist Leo Jensen, the metal frogs pay homage to the Battle of the Frogs and are named Manny, Willy, Windy and Swifty. William H. Grover was asked to draw up designs for the bridge, and initially produced a Victorian theme with spools to represent Willimantic having been the home of the American Thread Company. Windham Planning Commission chair David E. Philips, who wrote the 1984 book Legendary Connecticut, suggested adding frogs to the mix. Residents also offered suggestions for the bridge. One returned from Serbia with a travel brochure of a bridge with dragons on either end that supposedly wag their tails when virgins walk over it. Margaret P. Reich, executive director of the Windham Regional Planning Agency, said "we'd like to create a similar urban legend, but with frogs—and probably not involving virgins."

References

1754 animal deaths
1754 in the Thirteen Colonies
Connecticut folklore
Fictional battles
Frogs in culture
Legendary amphibians
Windham, Connecticut